Torricellia is a genus of flowering plants belonging to the family Torricelliaceae.

It is native to Eastern Himalaya, Nepal, Tibet, southern China and also Vietnam.

Known species:
 Torricellia angulata Oliv. 
 Torricellia tiliifolia DC. 

The genus name of Torricellia is in honour of Evangelista Torricelli (1608–1647), an Italian physicist and mathematician. 
It was first described and published in Prodr. Vol.4 on page 257 in 1830.

References

Torricelliaceae
Apiales genera
Plants described in 1830
Flora of East Himalaya
Flora of Nepal
Flora of Tibet
Flora of China
Flora of Vietnam